KLSI (107.3 FM) is a radio station licensed to Mooreland, Oklahoma, United States. The station is currently owned by Classic Communications, Inc.

History
This station was assigned call sign KLSI on January 21, 2014. Before that, they were assigned as KXIJ on November 5, 2012.

References

External links
http://woodwardradio.com/klsi.html

LSI
Radio stations established in 1987
Classic hits radio stations in the United States